Codium spongiosum is a species of seaweed in the family Codiaceae.

It has irregular lobes and moderately firm while alive becoming more spongy once dead.

The species is similar to Codium lucasii which adheres more tightly to rock surfaces.

It is epilithic in the subtidal to intertidal zones. Mostly situated in calmer waters from the low tide mark to several metres depth. It is often found in warmer waters but has a scattered distribution in colder waters.

The species was first formally described by the botanist Harvey in 1855 in Some account of the marine botany of the colony of Western Australia, published in the Transactions of the Royal Irish Academy. The type specimen was collected from King George Sound along the south coast of Western Australia.

In Western Australia is found along the coast in the Kimberley and as far south as the Recherche Archipelago. It is also found along South Australian coasts on the Eyre Peninsula, Yorke Peninsula, Kangaroo Island and Fleurieu Peninsula. It is common in all tropical and subtropical waters.

References

spongiosum
Plants described in 1855